Ligier is a French automobile and minibus maker created by former racing driver and rugby player Guy Ligier (1930–2015), specialized in the manufacturing of microcars.
Ligier is best known for its involvement in the Formula 1 World Championship between 1976 and 1996.

In collaboration with Automobiles Martini, the Ligier-Martini entity offered sports prototypes used in endurance or hillclimbing (CN). After the announcement of the creation of the new category LMP3 by the ACO, Ligier and Martini associated with Onroak Automotive (the manufacturer department of OAK Racing) to offer a full range of prototypes (CN, LMP3, LMP1 and LMP2).

History

The firm entered the automobile business with the Ligier JS2, a mid-engined sports car for the road initially powered by a Ford V6 and from 1971 by the same Maserati V6 engine as the Citroën SM. The JS2 was considered by many as a well-designed car with a very good power-to-weight ratio. The Ligier motorcars were all designated with the prefix "JS" in honour of Ligier's great friend and cohort Jo Schlesser who was killed in the 1968 French Grand Prix while driving for Honda. The final SMs were also produced in the Ligier factory in Vichy. The 1973 energy crisis caused such a decline in the market for the JS2 that production ceased soon after, and the firm changed its focus to microcars, beginning with the 1980 moped-powered Ligier JS4.

One of the world's first experimental prototypes of automatic parallel parking was developed on a Ligier electric car at INRIA in the mid-1990s.

In September 2008, Ligier Automobiles completed its acquisition of Beneteau Group's Microcar division, with financing provided by 21 investimenti partners. Phillipe Ligier, son of the company's founder, remains as CEO. The Ligier and Microcar brands are to retain their separate identities and manufacturing facilities. The merger creates Europe's second largest microcar manufacturer (after Daimler's Smart unit, if one considers that a microcar), and largest manufacturer of drivers license-exempt vehicles.

In August 2018, Ligier teased a new road-going sports car to celebrate their 50th anniversary. The car will be built in collaboration with Onroak. It will feature a 3.7 liter V6 producing approximately 330 hp, and a 6-speed manual transmission. It will be homologated to FIA E II-SH regulation. More details are to be released in September 2018, and it is expected to go on sale in November 2018 at a price of €89,000.

Models

The Ligier model line currently consists of the JS50 line of mini cars, the X-Pro line of small commercial vehicles, and the Be Up/Be Two line of open-air, roadster-type vehicles. The company also produces a line of quad bikes and off-road utility vehicles sold as the Be Pro, Be Four, and Be Truck.

The JS50, Ixo, Xtoo, Nova or Ambra are about two and a half meters long and have two seats. They are front-engined. Power units include two 2-cylinder four-stroke diesels of about half a liter displacement and feature a CVT for power transfer.

EZ10

The Ligier vehicle that's gained the most attention, is EZ10 EasyMile, a self-driving shuttle bus for light city transit. EasyMile SAS develops and markets the autonomous vehicles, and is a joint venture formed in June 2014 by Ligier and Robosoft Technology PTE Ltd (France). The joint venture is the result of the CityMobil2 project co-funded by the European Union's Seventh Framework Programme for research and technological development (FP7).

In 2017, EZ-10 was introduced on the grounds of National Taiwan University in Taipei, and in Tallinn, Estonia.

In conjunction with Estonia's presidency of the EU Council, the minibus was presented in Tallinn on 14 July 2017 by EasyMile, and the tech companies in Estonia that co-financed the month-and-a-half-long project to bring the shuttle bus to the country. The buses will serve one line, including a stretch of tram line under reconstruction, and will run in Tallinn until the end of August.

Ligier in motorsport

Gallery

External links

 Official website
 Pictures of Microcars made by Ligier

References

 
Vehicle manufacturing companies established in 1968
Bus manufacturers of France
Car manufacturers of France
Piaggio Group
Minibuses
Microcars
Quadricycles
1968 establishments in France
French brands
Sports car manufacturers
French racecar constructors
Nissan in motorsport
24 Hours of Le Mans teams